Qarasu (also, Gadzhiyevo and Karasu) is a village and municipality in the Hajigabul Rayon of Azerbaijan.  "Qarasu" means "black water" in the Azerbaijani language. It has a population of 2,407.

References 

Populated places in Hajigabul District